This is a bibliography of works on Canada. For an annotated bibliography and evaluation of major books, see also Canada: A Reader's Guide, (2nd ed., 2000) by J.André Senécal, online.

Overviews

Geography and environment
Bibliographies

Atlases
 
 
 
 
 
 
 Matthews, Geoffrey J. (1993)  Historical Atlas of Canada: Addressing the twentieth century, 1891-1961. University of Toronto Press 
Schwartzenberger, Tina (2005), The Canadian Shield, Weigl Educational Publishers Limited

Cities and suburbs
 
 
 
 

 Lewis, Robert.  (2001)   Manufacturing Montreal: The Making of an Industrial Landscape, 1850 to 1930.  Johns Hopkins University Press, 
 
 Morton, Suzanne. (1995) Ideal Surroundings: Domestic Life in a Working-Class Suburb in the 1920s  (Studies in Gender and History)

Climate

Environmentalism
 
 
 Desbiens, Caroline. Power from the North: Territory, Identity, and the Culture of Hydroelectricity in Quebec (2014)
 Desfor, Gene and Roger Keil, eds. Nature and the City: Making Environmental Policy in Toronto and Los Angeles (2004)
 
 
Pyne, Stephen J. Awful Splendour: A Fire History of Canada (2008), on human uses and control of fires

Fauna and flora
 
Drushka, Ken (2003), Canada's forests: a history, McGill-Queen's University Press, 
 
 
 Ross, Alexander Milton (1871),  The Birds of Canada, Rowsell and Hutchison.

History

Crowley, Terence Allan, (1994) The essentials of Canadian history : pre-colonization  to 1867, the beginning of a nation, Research and Education Association 
 
 
  Leacock,  Stephen (2009), The Dawn of Canadian History: A Chronicle of Aboriginal Canada, Dodo Press 
 

 

 
 
 Turgeon, Pierre  (2002), Canada: A People's History, Volume 1, Marks & Spencer

Military and conflicts

Overviews

 
Specific
 
 Bercuson, David J. (1999). Blood on the Hills: The Canadian Army in the Korean War  University of Toronto Press, 
 Busch, Briton Cooper (2003), Canada and the Great War: Western Front Association papers,  McGill-Queen's University Press 
 
 Cave, Alfred A. (2004), The French and Indian war, Greenwood Press 
 Clearwater, John  (1998),  Canadian nuclear weapons: the untold story of Canada's Cold War arsenal, Dundurn Press 
 
 
 
 Granatstein, J. L. Canada's War: The Politics of the Mackenzie King Government. Oxford UP, (1975).
 Granatstein, J. L., and Desmond Morton. A Nation Forged in Fire: Canadians and the Second World War, 1939–1945 (1989).
 
 Hayes, Geoffrey et al. eds. Canada and the Second World War: Essays in Honour of Terry Copp (2012) specialized essays by scholars excerpt
 
 Keshen, Jeffrey A. Saints, Sinners, and Soldiers: Canada's Second World War (2004)
 Senior, H. (1996). The last invasion of Canada: The Fenian raids, 1866-1870. Dundurn Press. 
 
 Wrong, George M. (1968). Canada and the American Revolution: The Disruption of the First British Empire, Rowman & Littlefield Publishers.

Indigenous

Bibliographies

Historical

Affairs of state

Government

Politics

 
 
 
 
 
 
 
 
 
 
 
 
Katherine Fierlbeck, Political Thought in Canada: An Intellectual History, Broadview Press, 2006
Ian McKay, Rebels, Reds, Radicals: Rethinking Canada's Left History, Between the Lines, 2006

Monarchy

Law
 
 
 Black-Branch, Jonathan L (1995), Making sense of the Canadian Charter of Rights and Freedoms, Canadian Education Association 
 
Greene, Ian (1989),The Charter of Rights,  Toronto, James Lorimer and Company,

Crime
Auger, Michel; Edwards, Peter (2004), The encyclopedia of Canadian organized crime: from Captain Kidd to Mom Boucher, Marks & Spencer 

 
 Carrigan, D. Owen. (1991) Crime and punishment in Canada: a history (Oxford University Press, 1991)

Economy

Science and technology

Social welfare

Foreign relations

Demographic and social history

 
 
 
 

 

 

 

Roderic Beaujot and Don Kerr, (2007) The Changing Face of Canada: Essential Readings in Population, Canadian Scholars' Press .

Languages

Religion
 *

Immigration
  Adu-Febiri, Francis (2009), Succeeding from the margins of Canadian society: a strategic resource for new immigrants, refugees and international students,  CCB Pub
DeRocco, John F. Chabot. (2008) From Sea to Sea to Sea: A Newcomer's Guide to Canada Full Blast Productions,

Women

 Cook, Sharon Anne; McLean, Lorna; and O'Rourke, Kate, eds. Framing Our Past: Canadian Women's History in the Twentieth Century (2001). 498 pp. essays by scholars
 Dumont, Micheline, et al. (The Clio Collective). Quebec Women: A History (1987)    

 Forestell, Nancy M., Kathryn M. McPherson, and Cecilia Louise Morgan, eds. Gendered Pasts: Historical Essays in Femininity and Masculinity in Canada (2003) 370 pp. excerpt and text search 
 Gleason, Mona, and Adele Perry, eds.  Rethinking Canada: The Promise of Women's History. (5th ed. 2006) 407 pp.; 24 essays by scholars  online review
 Mitchinson, Wendy. Canadian Women: A Reader (1996), essays by scholars
 Parr, Joy, ed. Gender and History In Canada (1996)
 Parr, Joy. "Gender History and Historical Practice," The Canadian Historical Review (1995) 76:354-376
 Prentice, Alison and Susan Mann Trofimenkoff, eds. The Neglected Majority: Essays in Canadian Women's History (2 vol 1985), essays by scholars
 Prentice, Alison, et al. Canadian Women: a history (1996, 2nd edition)
 Sangster, Joan, ed. Through Feminist Eyes: Essays on Canadian Women's History (Athabasca University Press, 2011) online review.
 Smith, Michelle J., Clare Bradford, et al. From Colonial to Modern: Transnational Girlhood in Canadian, Australian, and New Zealand Literature, 1840-1940 (2018) excerpt

Culture

 
 - 
 -

Art
 
 
 
 
 Harper, Russell. (1981)  Painting in Canada: A History 2nd ed. Toronto: University of Toronto Press. 
 
 
 Nasgaard, Roald. (2007) Abstract Painting in Canada, Vancouver: Douglas and McIntyre. 
Norwell, Iris. (2011), Painters Eleven:The Wild Ones of Canadian Art, Publishers Group West, 
 
 
 Tippett, Maria. (1993) By a Lady: Celebrating Three Centuries of Art by Canadian Women. Toronto: Penguin Books.

Film
Foster, Charles (2000).  Stardust and Shadows: Canadians in Early Hollywood, Dundurn Press, 
Druick, Zoë.  Aspa Kotsopoulos (2008) Programming reality: perspectives on English-Canadian television, Wilfrid Laurier University Press 
 Melnyk, George.  One Hundred Years of Canadian Cinema. U. of Toronto Press, 2004. 361 pp.
 Morris, Peter (1978). Embattled shadows: a history of Canadian cinema, 1895-1939, McGill-Queen's University Press, 
 Wise, Wyndham, ed. Essential guide to Canadian film. 2001

Literature

Media

Multiculturalism

Music
 
 
 2001 ed. , 2010 ed. .
 
 
 
Canadian Musical works  1900-1980 a bibliography of general and analytically sources. Ottawa : Canadian Association of Music Libraries, (1983)

Sports
 
 
Hall, M. Ann (2002), The girl and the game : a history of women's sport in Canada, Broadview Press

Provinces and territories

See also

Outline of Canada
Index of Canada-related articles
List of Canadian historians
Lists of books
List of bibliographies
 List of academic databases and search engines
 List of digital library projects
 List of scientific journals
 List of digital library projects
 List of online databases
 List of online encyclopedias
 List of educational video websites
 List of neuroscience databases

Further reading
 Bruchet, Susan, and Gwynneth Evans (1978). Theses in Canada: a Guide to Sources of Information about Theses Completed or in Preparation = Thèses au Canada: Guide sur les sources documentaires relatives aux thèses complétées ou en cours de rédaction. National Library of Canada, 1978. 
 McInnis, Edgar (1969). Canada: a Political and Social History. Third ed. Toronto, Ont.: Hold, Rinehart and Winston of Canada. N.B.: The first ed. had been published in 1947. 
 National Library of Canada. Canadiana 1867–1900, Monographs: Canada's National Bibliography, Microfiche Edition: an Introduction. Ottawa: National Library of Canada, 1980. Text, texte-bêche, in English and in French.

External links
Canadiana: The National Bibliography of Canada - Library and Archives Canada
 CBC Archives - Canadian Broadcasting Corporation
 The Bibliographical Society of Canada – La Société bibliographique du Canada